Roanaka Ahangama (born 14 May 1994) is a Sri Lankan cricketer. He made his List A debut on 19 December 2019, for Galle Cricket Club in the 2019–20 Invitation Limited Over Tournament.

References

External links
 

1994 births
Living people
Sri Lankan cricketers
Galle Cricket Club cricketers
Place of birth missing (living people)